Complex systems biology (CSB) is a branch or subfield of mathematical and theoretical biology invented by Robert Rosen concerned with complexity of both structure and function in biological organisms, as well as the emergence and evolution of organisms and species, with emphasis being placed on the interconnectivity of, and within, biological network inference, and on  modelling the fundamental relations inherent to life. 

According to Baianu et al.  CSB is a field that has only a partial overlap with the more conventional concepts of complex systems theory and systems biology, because CSB is concerned with philosophy and human consciousness. Moreover, mathematics can model a wide range of complex systems, but this is claimed not to be relevant.

Complexity of organisms and biosphere
There is no satisfying definition of complexity in biology.

According to Rosen, most complex system models are not about biological subjects, such as genomes and organisms, although biology has been successfully modelled since the 19th century.

Two approaches based on information theory and network topology/graph theory have been combined to model human consciousness. 

Regarding ontology (the philosophical metaphysics of reality), one is assuming that there is a hierarchy of complexity levels of organization distinct from reality. 

Baianu et al. claim that taxonomic ranks such as order, family, genus, species, etc. reflect a hierarchy of complexity levels of organization in biology.

Because of their variability, ability to heal and self-reproduce, and so on, organisms are defined as 'meta-systems' of simpler systems in CSB. A meta-system is a system of systems. Autopoiesis also models such a biological system of systems, however, Baianu et al. claim that in biology a meta-system is not equivalent to such a system of systems. They also claim it differs from the meta-system defined in a blog by Kent D. Palmer because organisms are different from machines or robots. If, according to Hopcroft et al., robots or automata can be defined by five qualities: states, startup state, input and output sets/alphabet and transition function, organisms are different.

Topics in complex systems biology

The following is a list of topics covered in complex systems biology:
 Applicability of quantum theory to genetics.
 Relational biology

See also

 Complexity
Complex system
Biological system
 Dynamical system
 Dynamical systems theory
 Emergence
Mathematical and theoretical biology
 Pattern oriented modeling
Systems biology
 Systems theory
 Systems theory in anthropology

Notes

References cited
 Baianu, I. C., Computer Models and Automata Theory in Biology and Medicine., Monograph, Ch.11 in M. Witten (Editor), Mathematical Models in Medicine, vol. 7., Vol. 7: 1513-1577 (1987),Pergamon Press:New York, (updated by Hsiao Chen Lin in 2004 
 Renshaw, E., Modelling biological populations in space and time. C.U.P., 1991. 
 Rosen, Robert.1991, Life Itself: A Comprehensive Inquiry into the Nature, Origin, and Fabrication of Life, Columbia University Press, published posthumously:
 Rosen, Robert .1970. Dynamical system theory in biology. New York, Wiley-Interscience. 
 Rosen, Robert. 2000, Essays on Life Itself, Columbia University Press.
 Rosen, Robert. 2003, "Anticipatory Systems; Philosophical, Mathematical, and Methodolical Foundations", Rosen Enterprises publs.

Further reading
A general list of Theoretical biology/Mathematical biology references, including an updated list of actively contributing authors.
A list of references for applications of category theory in relational biology.
An updated list of publications of theoretical biologist Robert Rosen
 Theory of Biological Anthropology (Documents No. 9 and 10 in English)
 Drawing the Line Between Theoretical and Basic Biology, a forum article by Isidro A. T. Savillo
 

Mathematical and theoretical biology
Bioinformatics
Epidemiology
Biostatistics
Biotechnology
Complex systems theory
Systems science